Hodori was the official mascot of the 1988 Summer Olympic Games in Seoul, South Korea. The stylized tiger was designed by Kim Hyun as an amicable Amur tiger, portraying the friendly and hospitable traditions of the Korean people.

Origin and meaning of the name
"Ho" is derived from the Korean word for tiger ("horangi"), and "dori" is a diminutive for boys in Korean. The name Hodori was chosen from 2,295 suggestions sent in by the public.

Other uses and variations

1986 Asian Games
Hodori was also the official mascot of the 1986 Asian Games, the test event of the Olympics.

Hosuni
There was also a female tiger named "Hosuni", but she was seldom used. "Suni" is a diminutive for girls in Korean.

Korean Tae-Kwon-Do National Demonstration Team
Hodori is also the name of the Korean Tae-Kwon-Do National Demonstration Team, which also uses the Hodori tiger as their symbol.

Yummy Korean BBQ restaurant
The mascot of the Hawaii-based Korean barbecue restaurant Yummy Korean BBQ is adapted from Hodori. The Yummy tiger doesn't wear the Olympic rings, has a white tongue instead of red, wears a solid black hat, and has a green letter "Y" on his tummy.

See also

 Tigers in Korean culture

External links
 IOC Site on 1988 Summer Olympics

1988 Summer Olympics
Fictional South Korean people
South Korean culture
Fictional tigers
Tiger mascots
Olympic mascots
Feline mascots
South Korean mascots